Cooch Behar Sadar subdivision is a subdivision of the Cooch Behar district in the state of West Bengal, India.

Subdivisions
Cooch Behar district is divided into the following administrative subdivisions:

Administrative units
Cooch Behar Sadar subdivision has 1 police station, 2 community development blocks, 2 panchayat samitis, 28 gram panchayats, 259 mouzas, 253 inhabited villages, 1 municipality and 8 census towns. The municipality is: Cooch Behar. The census towns are: Kharimala Khagrabari, Guriahati, Dhaliabari, Baneswar, Khagrabari, Baisguri, Chakchaka and Takagachh. The subdivision has its headquarters at Cooch Behar.

Police stations
Police stations in the Darjeeling Sadar subdivision have the following features and jurisdiction:

Blocks
Community development blocks in the Cooch Behar Sadar subdivision are:

Gram panchayats
The subdivision contains 28 gram panchayats under 2 community development blocks:

 Cooch Behar I block consists of 15 gram panchayats, viz. Chandamari, Falimari, Haribhanga, Patchhara, Chilkirhat, Ghughumari, Jiranpur, Putimari–Fuleswari, Dauaguri, Guriahati–I, Moyamari, Deoanhat, Guriahati–II, Panisala and Suktabari.
 Cooch Behar II block consists of 13 gram panchayats, viz. Ambari, Dhangdhinguri, Madhupur, Takagachh–Rajarhat, Baneswar, Gopalpur, Marichbari–Kholta, Bararangras, Khagrabari, Patlakhawa, Chakchaka, Khapaidanga and Pundibari.

Education
Given in the table below (data in numbers) is a comprehensive picture of the education scenario in Cooch Behar district, with data for the year 2012–13.

Note: Primary schools include junior basic schools; middle schools, high schools and higher secondary schools include madrasahs; technical schools include junior technical schools, junior government polytechnics, industrial technical institutes, industrial training centres, nursing training institutes etc.; technical and professional colleges include engineering colleges, medical colleges, para-medical institutes, management colleges, teachers training and nursing training colleges, law colleges, art colleges, music colleges etc. Special and non-formal education centres include sishu siksha kendras, madhyamik siksha kendras, centres of Rabindra mukta vidyalaya, recognised Sanskrit tols, institutions for the blind and other handicapped persons, Anganwadi centres, reformatory schools etc.

Educational institutions
The following institutions are located in Cooch Behar Sadar subdivision:
Cooch Behar Panchanan Barma University was established at Cooch Behar in 2012.
Uttar Banga Krishi Vishwavidyalaya initially started functioning as a satellite campus of Bidhan Chandra Krishi Vishwavidyalaya and was formally established in 2001 at Pundibari.
Cooch Behar Government Engineering College was established in 2016 at Cooch Behar.
Acharya Brojendra Nath Seal College (formerly Victoria College) was established in 1888 at Cooch Behar.
Cooch Behar College was established at Cooch Behar in 1970.
Thakur Panchanan Mahila Mahavidyalaya was established at Cooch Behar in 1981.
Dewanhat Mahavidyalaya was established in 2007 at Dewanhat.
Baneswar Sarathibala Mahavidyalaya was established at Baneswar in 2009.

Healthcare
The table below (all data in numbers) presents an overview of the medical facilities available and patients treated in the hospitals, health centres and sub-centres in 2013 in Cooch Behar district, with data for the year 2012–13.:

.* Excluding nursing homes.

Medical facilities
Medical facilities in the Cooch Behar Sadar subdivision are as follows:

Hospitals: (Name, location, beds) 
M.J.N. Hospital (District Hospital), Cooch Behar M, 400 beds
Cooch Behar Jail Hospital, Cooch Behar M, 10 beds
Cooch Behar Police Hospital, Cooch Behar M, 30 beds
J.D.Hospital (TB), Cooch Behar II, 120 beds
New Cooch Behar Railway Hospital, Cooch Behar II, 2 beds

Rural Hospitals: (Name, CD block, location, beds) 
Dewanhat Rural Hospital, Cooch Behar I CD block, Dewanhat, 30 beds
Pundibari Rural Hospital, Cooch Behar II block, Pundibari, 30 beds

Primary Health Centres : (CD block-wise)(CD block, PHC location, beds)
Cooch Behar I CD block:  Putimari Phuleswari (PO Patpushu) (10), Chilkirhat (6)
Cooch Behar II CD block: Patlakhawa (6), Bokalir Math (4),  Gopalpur (10), Kaljani (4)

Legislative segments
As per order of the Delimitation Commission in respect of the delimitation of constituencies in the West Bengal, the area under Cooch Behar–II block will constitute the Cooch Behar Uttar assembly constituency of West Bengal. The Cooch Behar municipality and nine gram panchayats of Cooch Behar–I block, viz. Chandamari, Chilkirhat, Falimari, Ghughumari, Haribhanga, Moyamari, Patchhara, Putimari–Fuleswari and Sutkabari will form the Cooch Behar Dakshin assembly constituency. The other six gram panchayats of Cooch Behar–I block, viz. Jiranpur, Dauaguri, Guriahati–I, Deoanhat, Guriahati–II and  Panisala will be part of Natabari assembly constituency. Cooch Behar Uttar constituency will be reserved for Scheduled castes (SC) candidates. All these three assembly constituencies will be part of Cooch Behar (Lok Sabha constituency), which will be reserved for SC candidates.

References

Subdivisions of West Bengal
Subdivisions in Cooch Behar district
Cooch Behar district